Sguil (pronounced sgweel or squeal) is a collection of free software components for Network Security Monitoring (NSM) and event driven analysis of IDS alerts. The sguil client is written in Tcl/Tk and can be run on any operating system that supports these.  Sguil integrates alert data from Snort, session data from SANCP, and full content data from a second instance of Snort running in packet logger mode.

Sguil is an implementation of a Network Security Monitoring system. NSM is defined as "collection, analysis, and escalation of indications and warnings to detect and respond  to intrusions."

Sguil is released under the GPL 3.0.

Tools that make up Sguil

See also 

 Sagan
 Intrusion detection system (IDS)
 Intrusion prevention system (IPS)
 Network intrusion detection system (NIDS)
 Metasploit Project
 nmap
 Host-based intrusion detection system comparison

References

External links
Sguil Homepage

Computer network security
Linux security software
Free network management software
Software that uses Tk (software)